Standard Oil Co. of New Jersey v. United States, 221 U.S. 1 (1910), was a case in which the Supreme Court of the United States found Standard Oil Co. of New Jersey guilty of monopolizing the petroleum industry through a series of abusive and anticompetitive actions. The Court's remedy was to divide Standard Oil into several geographically separate and eventually competing firms.

Facts
By the 1880s, Standard Oil was using its large market share of refining capacity to begin integrating backward into oil exploration and crude oil distribution and forward into retail distribution of its refined products to stores and, eventually, service stations throughout the United States. Standard Oil allegedly used its size and clout to undercut competitors in a number of ways that were considered "anti-competitive," including underpricing and threats to suppliers and distributors who did business with Standard's competitors.

The government sought to prosecute Standard Oil under the Sherman Antitrust Act. The action was brought before the Circuit Court of Eastern District of Missouri under the Expediting Act in November 1906, and the court issued their decree of dissolution in November 1909 and their opinion in December 1909.

The main issue before the Supreme Court was whether it was within the power of Congress to prevent one company from acquiring numerous others through means that might have been considered legal in common law, but still posed a significant constraint on competition by mere virtue of their size and market power, as implied by the Antitrust Act.

Over a period of decades, the Standard Oil Company of New Jersey had bought up virtually all of the oil refining companies in the United States. Initially, the growth of Standard Oil was driven by superior refining technology and consistency in the kerosene products (i.e., product standardization) that were the main use of oil in the early decades of the company's existence. The management of Standard Oil then reinvested their profits in the acquisition of most of the refining capacity in the Cleveland area, then a center of oil refining, until Standard Oil controlled the refining capacity of that key production market.

By 1870, Standard Oil was producing about 10% of the United States output of refined oil. This quickly increased to 20% through the elimination of the competitors in the Cleveland area.

Judgment
As in the case against American Tobacco, which was decided the same day, the Court concluded that these facts were within the power of Congress to regulate under the Commerce Clause.  The Court recognized that "taken literally," the term "restraint of trade" could refer to any number of normal or usual contracts that do not harm the public. The Court embarked on a lengthy exegesis of English authorities relevant to the meaning of the term "restraint of trade." Based on this review, the Court concluded that the term "restraint of trade" had come to refer to a contract that resulted in "monopoly or its consequences." The Court identified three such consequences: higher prices, reduced output, and reduced quality.

The Court concluded that a contract offended the Sherman Act only if the contract restrained trade "unduly"—that is if the contract resulted in one of the three consequences of monopoly that the Court identified. A broader meaning, the Court suggested, would ban normal and usual contracts, and would thus infringe liberty of contract. The Court endorsed the rule of reason enunciated by William Howard Taft in Addyston Pipe and Steel Company v. United States (1899), written when Taft had been Chief Judge of the United States Court of Appeals for the Sixth Circuit. The Court concluded, however, that the behavior of the Standard Oil Company went beyond the limitations of this rule.

Concurrence
Justice John Marshall Harlan concurred in the result, but dissented against adopting a "rule of reason". It departed from precedent that the Sherman Act banned any contract that restrained trade "directly." He said the following:

Significance

The Standard Oil case resulted in the breakup of Standard Oil into 43 separate companies. Many of these have since recombined; the largest present direct descendants of Standard Oil are ExxonMobil (Standard Oil of New Jersey and Standard Oil of New York) and Chevron (Standard Oil of California). Some Standard Oil descendants merged into other companies, particularly BP, which acquired/merged with Standard Oil of Ohio and Amoco.

While some scholars have agreed with Justice Harlan's characterization of prior case law, others have agreed with William Howard Taft, who concluded that despite its different verbal formulation, Standard Oil's "rule of reason" was entirely consistent with prior case law.

See also

US antitrust law
 List of United States Supreme Court cases, volume 221

Notes

References

External links
 
 

Standard Oil
United States Supreme Court cases
United States Supreme Court cases of the White Court
United States antitrust case law
United States energy case law
1911 in United States case law
ExxonMobil litigation
1911 in American law